Kaparoqtalik Glacier is a glacier located in the southern coast of the Byam Martin Mountains on Bylot Island, Nunavut, Canada. It lies in Sirmilik National Park.

See also

List of glaciers in Canada

References

Glaciers of Qikiqtaaluk Region
Arctic Cordillera